Love or Something Like That is a 2014 Ghanaian Nigerian film directed by Shirley Frimpong-Manso. It stars John Dumelo, Joselyn Dumas and OC Ukeje. The film had its London premiere on 28 November 2014 at Odeon Cinema. It received two nominations at the 11th Africa Movie Academy Awards.

Cast
John Dumelo as Alex Walker
Joselyn Dumas as Kwarley Mettle
OC Ukeje as Henry Dominic
Nana Mensah as Asantewaa
Christabel Ekeh as Sonia
Eckow Smith-Asante as Psychologist

Plot 

The film tells a story about a newly married couple and the distractions they faced from work shortly after the wedding ceremony. Kwarley Mettle (Joselyn Dumas) had raw sex with her boyfriend, Henry Dominic (OC Ukeje) against her will, two years before getting married. This has made her require that her husband, Alex Walker (John Dumelo) used protection each time they slept together. Henry and Kwarley meet again after he got admitted to her hospital for treatment. On recognizing his ex-girlfriend, Henry immediately leaves the hospital without speaking to her. Kwarley went to his patient file, to see that he has cancer and AIDs. She located his home address then paid him a visit. On getting there, she told him about her disappointment in him.

Reception 
The film got negative reviews from 360nobs.com, who drew similarities between the film and Tango with Me, another film directed by Shirley Frimpong-Manso. It noted that in both films, couples were finding it difficult to have sex because of a rape incident. She also noted extra-marital affair as a buffer effect in both films. Tango with Me and Love or Something Like That both ended with the husbands feeling guilty of not being very caring to their spouse. Additionally, Devil in the Detail, another film by this director, was highlighted as having very dialogues as the film during marital advice session to the couple. It also criticized Kwarley being flabbergasted after seeing Henry for the first time despite having his file on her desk. Finally, the film was described as having a faulty premise since it is now very common for couples to have HIV test before getting married in churches, not to mention that the bride was even a medical doctor.

Kolapo Olapoju of YNaija received the film with mixed reviews. It criticized the sex scene in the film, drawing similarity with the ones in Devil in the Detail, describing it as "clumsy and unbelievable" and explaining that John and Joselyn were "clothed from the waist upwards, the lower halves hidden under covered sheets, cavorting and pretending to be having the best sex possible." It faulted the storyline as being unrealistic but praised the acting of Joselyn Dumas, as the major outstanding factor in the film. It also played down the use of Davido's song in the film, as only to draw [Nollywood] market.

References 

2014 films
Ghanaian drama films
2014 romantic drama films
Films about cancer
HIV/AIDS in film
Films directed by Shirley Frimpong-Manso
Nigerian romantic drama films
2010s English-language films
English-language Ghanaian films
English-language Nigerian films